Arumugam Kandiah Sarveswaran is a Sri Lankan Tamil politician and provincial minister.

Sarveswaran is the brother of Eelam People's Revolutionary Liberation Front leader Suresh Premachandran.

Sarveswaran contested the 2013 provincial council election as one of the Tamil National Alliance's candidates in Jaffna District and was elected to the Northern Provincial Council. After the election he was appointed to assist the Chief Minister on economic planning. He took his oath as provincial councillor in front of attorney-at-law K. Thayaparan at Vavuniya on 16 October 2013.

Sarveswaran was sworn in as Minister of Education, Sports and Youth Affairs and Cultural Affairs in front of Governor Reginald Cooray on 29 June 2017.

References

Culture ministers of Sri Lankan provinces
Education ministers of Sri Lankan provinces
Eelam People's Revolutionary Liberation Front politicians
Living people
Members of the Northern Province Board of Ministers
People from Northern Province, Sri Lanka
Sports ministers of Sri Lankan provinces
Sri Lankan Tamil politicians
Tamil National Alliance politicians
Year of birth missing (living people)
Youth ministers of Sri Lankan provinces